Val Allen Browning (August 20, 1895 – May 16, 1994) was an American industrialist, philanthropist and third-generation gunmaker. His grandfather, Jonathan Browning, opened a gun shop in Ogden, Utah in 1852, and his father, John Browning,  is regarded as one of the most successful firearms designers of the 19th and 20th centuries.

Life
Born in Ogden, Utah Territory, Browning graduated from Ogden High School in 1913 and later studied law and engineering at Cornell University. As a young man he worked in the shop his grandfather had opened.

In 1918, Browning was commissioned as a second lieutenant with the United States Army and served with the 79th Infantry Division at Verdun during World War I. In 1920, he became the manager of the manufacturing of John Browning guns in Liège, Belgium, and served as his father's personal representative to Fabrique Nationale de Herstal. Upon his father's death in 1926, Browning had the responsibility of completing the projects that were not finished by his father, including the Browning Superposed shotgun and the Browning Hi-Power pistol (GP-35) (the latter in cooperation with his father's Belgian assistant, Dieudonné Saive).

In 1924, Browning married Ann Chaffin (1901–1975) of Farmington, Utah, and they had four children. They lived in Belgium until 1935 when Browning returned to Utah as president of Browning Arms Company.

Browning received 48 gun patents during his career, compared to his father John Browning's 128 American gun patents. In 1955, Val Browning was awarded Knighthood in the Order of Léopold by King Baudouin of Belgium for an "outstanding contribution to the Gun Making Art;" an honor that had been bestowed upon his father in 1914.

Browning spent his career representing business interests in the United States and Europe. In addition to chairing Browning Arms, he served as director of the First Security Corporation, Utah International, Amalgamated Sugar Company, and the Mountain Fuel Supply Company. Through the 1940s purchase of some of W. L. Wattis' of founding shares in Utah Construction Company, Browning shared in the substantial gains in the sale of Utah International. Browning was a benefactor of Dixie College and Weber State University, and his donation of his substantial collection of European fine art formed the basis of the Utah Museum of Fine Arts masterwork paintings.

Browning died May 16, 1994, and was buried at Lindquist Washington Heights Memorial Park in Ogden Utah.

He was a member of the Church of Jesus Christ of Latter-day Saints.

Notes

References 
 Schwing, Neil. The Browning Superposed, John M. Browning's Last Legacy.

External links 

 Val A. Browning Center
 Utah Museum of Fine Arts
 Obituary of son, John Val Browning - Deseret News

1895 births
1994 deaths
Cornell University College of Engineering alumni
Utah Tech University people
Firearm designers
Businesspeople from Ogden, Utah
Businesspeople from Utah
Weber State University people
Latter Day Saints from Utah
United States Army officers
United States Army personnel of World War I
Cornell Law School alumni
20th-century American inventors
20th-century American philanthropists
20th-century American businesspeople
Military personnel from Utah